The Women's mass start event of the Biathlon World Championships 2016 was held on 13 March 2016. 30 athletes will participate over a course of 12.5 km.

Results
The race was started at 13:00 CET.

References

Women's mass start
2016 in Norwegian women's sport